The Alfred H. Richards House is a historic house located at 354 Highland Avenue in Quincy, Massachusetts, United States.

Description and history 
The two-story wood-framed house was built in 1923 for Alfred Richards, a bank executive. It is one of the last house built in the Wollaston Heights area, which had been mostly built out in the earlier decades of the 20th century. Designed by William Chapman, it has a five-bay main facade with three gabled dormers above, each with a round-arch window. The eave is decorated with dentil moulding and modillions.

The house was listed on the National Register of Historic Places on September 20, 1989.

See also
National Register of Historic Places listings in Quincy, Massachusetts

References

Colonial Revival architecture in Massachusetts
Houses completed in 1923
Houses in Quincy, Massachusetts
National Register of Historic Places in Quincy, Massachusetts
Houses on the National Register of Historic Places in Norfolk County, Massachusetts